Chaetorellia loricata is a species of tephritid or fruit flies in the genus Chaetorellia of the family Tephritidae.

Distribution
Britain, Germany, Ukraine & Kazakhstan, South to Spain, Italy & Turkey.

References

Tephritinae
Insects described in 1870
Diptera of Europe
Diptera of Asia
Taxa named by Camillo Rondani